The T2 SDE (System Development Environment) is an open source Linux distribution kit. It is primarily developed by René Rebe.

History 
ROCK Linux was started in the summer of 1996 by Claire Wolf. T2 SDE was forked in 2004, when developers where dissatisfied with the project. ROCK Linux was discontinued in 2010.

In August 2006, version 6.0 was released with ISO images for AMD64, i386, PPC64 and SPARC64. In July 2010, version 8.0 (codenamed "Phoenix") was released. In April 2021, version 21.4 was released. In July 2022, version 22.6 was released.

Usage 
Puppy Linux has used T2 SDE for compiling their packages. AskoziaPBX has used a fork of T2 SDE because it had support for Blackfin. Archivista made a document management system based on T2 SDE.

Hardware support 
T2 SDE supports the x86-64, x86, arm64, arm, RISC-V (32 and 64 bit), ppc64le, ppc64-32, sparc64, MIPS64, mipsel, hppa, m68k, alpha, and ia64 architectures. The PowerPC platform is well supported. There are ISO images available, or users can build it themselves.

T2 SDE has been shown to run on the Nintendo Wii. It also supports the SGI Octane and the PlayStation 3.

See also 

 OpenEmbedded
 Gentoo Linux
 Linux From Scratch

References

External links 

 
 Distrowatch
YouTube channel
Original official website of ROCK Linux

Light-weight Linux distributions
Embedded Linux distributions
Linux distributions